Pierce Butler (1 September 1922 – 20 February 1999) was a creamery manager and Fine Gael politician from County Tipperary in Ireland. He was a senator from 1969 to 1982.

Butler was born in Waterford in 1922, the son of the trade unionist John Butler, who later served as a Labour Party TD and Senator. He moved to County Tipperary to become an assistant manager of Mitchelstown Creamery, and lived in Cahir, where he became active in a number of local organisations, including Macra na Feirme, and the Cahir Credit union.

He married Eileen Sampson, whose brother was a member of Tipperary County Council, and became involved in the local Fine Gael party, using his business experience to help resolve the local party's financial difficulties.

Butler was elected in 1969 to the 12th Seanad, on the Agricultural Panel, and was re-elect to the next three Seanads until he stood down at 1983 election to the 17th Seanad.

See also
Families in the Oireachtas

References

1922 births
1999 deaths
Fine Gael senators
Members of the 12th Seanad
Members of the 13th Seanad
Members of the 14th Seanad
Members of the 15th Seanad
Politicians from County Tipperary
People from Cahir